High Lines is an album by American composer and violinist Michael Galasso recorded between 2002 and 2004 and released on the ECM label.

Reception
The Allmusic review by Richard S. Ginell awarded the album 3½ stars stating "At times, the album resembles a Glass soundtrack, but Galasso is not as predictable as Glass, freely roaming around various world cultures for inspiration, varying his bowing techniques to suit the mood... It's hard to predict how these mostly slight compositions will stand up to repeated listening, but they are beautifully recorded in the best ECM fashion".

Track listing
All compositions by Michael Galasso
 "Spheric" - 4:44   
 "Caravanserai Day" - 1:48   
 "Never More" - 0:44   
 "The Other" - 6:10   
 "Gothic Beach" - 3:15   
 "Quarantine" - 2:47   
 "Crossing Colors" - 3:30   
 "Chaconne" - 3:18   
 "Boreal" - 2:04   
 "High Lines" - 1:50   
 "Caravanserai Night" - 1:16   
 "Swan Pond" - 2:24   
 "Iranian Dream" - 2:16   
 "Fog And After" - 6:09   
 "Somnambulist" - 2:56   
 "Gorge Green" - 5:28   
Recorded at Rainbow Studio in Oslo, Norway in November 2002 and April 2004

Personnel
Michael Galasso - violin
Terje Rypdal -  guitar
Frank Colón - percussion
Marc Marder -  double bass

References

2005 albums
Michael Galasso albums
ECM Records albums
Albums produced by Manfred Eicher